The 1802 New Hampshire gubernatorial election took place on March 9, 1802. Incumbent Federalist Governor John Taylor Gilman won re-election to a ninth term, defeating Democratic-Republican candidate, former Governor and U.S. Senator John Langdon.

Results

References 

Gubernatorial
New Hampshire
1802